Deisswil may refer to:

in the Canton of Berne, Switzerland:
Deisswil bei Münchenbuchsee, a municipality
Deisswil bei Stettlen, a village part of Stettlen